Henry Messinger (May 30, 1915 – May 13, 1991) was an American politician from Pennsylvania who served as a Democratic member of the Pennsylvania State Senate for the 16th district from 1971 to 1982.

He was born in Allentown, Pennsylvania.

He served as majority whip in the Pennsylvania Senate from 1974 to 1980.

References

1915 births
1991 deaths
20th-century American politicians
Democratic Party Pennsylvania state senators
Politicians from Allentown, Pennsylvania